Warwick Farm Raceway was a motor racing facility which was in operation from 1960 to 1973. Warwick Farm Raceway hosted numerous major events during its life such as the Australian Grand Prix and rounds of both the Australian Touring Car Championship and the Tasman Series.

History
Warwick Farm Raceway was built in 1960 on the site of the Warwick Farm Racecourse, a horse racing track with which it was to co-exist throughout its history. When a motor racing meeting was scheduled, two "crossings" had to be placed over the top of the horse racing track, and then removed after racing had finished. It became one of Australia's premier motor racing venues and gained a reputation as a "drivers' track", hosting the Australian Grand Prix and rounds of both the Tasman Series and the Australian Drivers' Championship. It also staged Australian Touring Car Championship races during its later years. The last major race at Warwick Farm was the final round of the 1973 Australian Touring Car Championship on 15 July and the final race meeting was a club day held in August 1973.
The reason for the closure was financial - the Confederation of Australian Motorsport wanted to have armco fencing installed around the circuit, and the AJC wasn't willing to spend the money to upgrade the circuit.

Warwick Farm held its first meeting in December 1960. On a wet track, Ian "Pete" Geoghegan won the opening touring car race driving a Jaguar 3.4 Litre.

Driving a Lola T300 Formula 5000 in the 1972 Tasman Series, Gardner set a time of 1:24.0 during the Warwick Farm 100. Gardner finished second in the race he had won in 1971, 18 seconds behind Frank Matich driving his self-designed and built Matich A50 Repco-Holden.

Australian Grand Prix
Warwick Farm Raceway hosted the Australian Grand Prix a total of four times:

International 100
Warwick Farm hosted the annual International 100 from 1961 to 1973:

Australian Touring Car Championship
Warwick Farm Raceway hosted the single race Australian Touring Car Championship in 1968, and hosted rounds of the championship in 1970, 1972 and 1973.

Tasman Series
Warwick Farm Raceway hosted a round of the Tasman Series each year from 1964 to 1973.

Australian Drivers' Championship
Warwick Farm Raceway hosted a round of the Australian Drivers' Championship on 11 occasions.
1963 Australian Grand Prix – Jack Brabham – Repco Brabham BT4 Coventry Climax FPF
1963 Hordern Trophy – John Youl – Cooper T55 Coventry Climax FPF
1964 Hordern Trophy Leo Geoghegan – Lotus 32 Ford
1965 International 100 – Jim Clark – Lotus 32B Coventry Climax FPF
1965 Hordern Trophy – Bib Stillwell – Repco Brabham BT11A Coventry Climax FPF
1966 Hordern Trophy – Frank Gardner – Repco Brabham BT16 Coventry Climax FPF
1967 Hordern Trophy – Frank Gardner – Brabham BT23D Alfa Romeo
1968 Hordern Trophy – Kevin Bartlett – Brabham BT23D Alfa Romeo
1969 Hordern Trophy – Kevin Bartlett – Mildren Waggott
1970 Hordern Trophy – Leo Geoghegan – Lotus 59B Waggott
1972 Hordern Trophy – Frank Matich – Matich A50 Repco-Holden

Australian Sports Car Championship
Warwick Farm hosted a round of the Australian Sports Car Championship each year from 1969 to 1972.
 1969 RAC Trophy – Frank Matich – Matich SR4 Repco
 1970 RAC Trophy – Neil Allen – Elfin ME5 Chevrolet
 1971 RAC Trophy – John Harvey – McLaren M6 Repco
 1972 RAC Trophy – John Harvey – McLaren M6 Repco

Australian Manufacturers' Championship
Warwick Farm hosted a round of the Australian Manufacturers' Championship in 1971.
 1971 – Castrol Trophy – Colin Bond – Holden LC Torana GTR XU-1

Australian Formula Junior Championship
Warwick Farm hosted the Australian Formula Junior Championship in 1963.
 1963 – Leo Geoghegan – Lotus 22 Ford

Australian GT Championship
Warwick Farm hosted the Australian GT Championship in 1962.
 1962 – Frank Matich – Jaguar D-Type

London to Sydney Marathon rally - 1968
Warwick Farm was the venue for the finish of the London-Sydney Marathon. First place went to the Hillman Hunter crewed by Andrew Cowan, Colin Malkin and Brian Coyle.

References

Notes

Bibliography

External links
 
 

Sports venues in Sydney
Former Supercars Championship circuits
Defunct motorsport venues in Australia
Australian Grand Prix
Sports venues completed in 1960